Osechi-ryōri (御節料理, お節料理 or おせち) are traditional Japanese New Year foods. The tradition started in the Heian period (794–1185). Osechi are easily recognizable by their special boxes called jūbako (重箱), which resemble bentō boxes.  Like bentō boxes, jūbako are often kept stacked before and after use.

Examples of osechi dishes
The dishes that make up osechi each have a special meaning celebrating the New Year. Some examples are:
Daidai (橙, だいだい), Japanese bitter orange. Daidai means "from generation to generation" when written in different kanji as 代々. Like kazunoko below, it symbolizes a wish for children in the New Year.
 (伊達巻 or 伊達巻き or だてまき), sweet rolled omelette mixed with fish paste or mashed shrimp. They symbolize a wish for many auspicious days. On auspicious days (晴れの日, hare-no-hi), Japanese people traditionally wear fine clothing as a part of enjoying themselves. One of the meanings associated with the second kanji includes "fashionability," derived from the illustrious dress of the samurai from Date Han.
Kamaboko (蒲鉾, かまぼこ), broiled fish cake. Traditionally, slices of red and white kamaboko are alternated in rows or arranged in a pattern. The color and shape are reminiscent of Japan rising sun, and have a celebratory, festive meaning.
Kazunoko (数の子, かずのこ), herring roe. Kazu means "number" and ko means "child." It symbolizes a wish to be gifted with numerous children in the New Year.
Konbu (昆布), a kind of seaweed. It is associated with the word yorokobu, meaning "joy."
 (黒豆, くろまめ), black soybeans. Mame also means "health," symbolizing a wish for health in the New Year.
Kohaku-namasu (紅白なます), literally "red-white vegetable kuai," is made of daikon and carrot cut into thin strips and pickled in sweetened vinegar with yuzu flavor.
Tai (鯛, たい), red sea-bream. Tai is associated with the Japanese word medetai, symbolizing an auspicious event.
 (田作り), dried sardines cooked in soy sauce. The literal meaning of the kanji in tazukuri is "rice paddy maker," as the fish were used historically to fertilize rice fields. The symbolism is of an abundant harvest.
Zōni (雑煮), a soup of mochi rice cakes in clear broth (in eastern Japan) or miso broth (in western Japan).
Ebi (海老, えび), skewered prawns cooked with sake and soy sauce. It symbolizes a wish for a long-life, suggesting long beard and bent waist.
Nishiki tamago (錦卵/二色玉子), egg roulade; the egg is separated before cooking, yellow symbolizing gold, and white symbolizing silver, both of these together symbolising wealth and good fortune.
ZenZai is a hot dessert soup made of sweet red beans and often served with toasted rice cakes (mochi) or smaller shiratama dango (mini rice cakes). ZenZai was originally made with green beans, but after the world war the green beans were replaced by red beans.

History
The term osechi originally referred to o-sechi, a season or significant period. New Year's Day was one of the five seasonal festivals in the Imperial Court in Kyoto. This custom of celebrating particular days was introduced from China into Japan.

Originally, during the first three days of the New Year, it was taboo to use a hearth and cook meals, except when cooking zōni. Osechi was made by the close of the previous year, as women did not cook in the New Year.

In the earliest days, osechi consisted only of nimono, boiled vegetables with soy sauce and sugar or mirin. Over the generations, the variety of food included in osechi has increased. Today it may refer to anything prepared specially for the New Year, and some foreign dishes have been adopted as "Westernized osechi" (西洋お節 seiyō-osechi). And while osechi was traditionally prepared at home, it is also sold ready-made in specialty stores, grocery stores, and even convenience stores, such as 7-Eleven.

Especially in households where osechi is still homemade, toshi-koshi soba (年越し蕎麦) is eaten on New Year's Eve. Its name literally means "year-crossing soba." Although there may be some symbolism attributed to it (i.e., long life, health and energy in the upcoming year), this tradition may be regarded as largely pragmatic: the traditional wife, busy cooking several days' worth of food for everyone, would likely prefer to make something simple for immediate consumption. It is considered bad luck by many Japanese to leave any toshi-koshi soba uneaten.

See also
 Toso

References

"Osechi ryōri." Japan: An Illustrated Encyclopedia. Ed. Alan Campbell & David S. Noble. Tokyo: Kōdansha, 1995.

Japanese cuisine
New Year in Japan
Japanese cuisine terms
Japanese New Year foods